The Tandzut (also Գարպի Garpi) is a river in Lori Province, Northern Armenia, a right tributary of the  river Pambak (Kura basin). The source of the river is located on the Northern side of Pambak mountain range. It flows into the Pambak near the town of Vanadzor. The river Vanadzor is a tributary of the Tandzut.

Pollution
According to an article at MyNews.am large amounts of household and industrial waste are commonly sighted in and along the river.

References

Rivers of Armenia